Maniola is a genus of butterflies within the family Nymphalidae.

List of species
 Maniola telmessia (Zeller, 1847) – Turkish meadow brown
 Maniola halicarnassus Thomson, 1990
 Maniola nurag Ghiliani, 1852 – Sardinian meadow brown
 Maniola cypricola (Graves, 1928)
 Maniola chia Thomson, 1987
 Maniola jurtina (Linnaeus, 1758) – meadow brown
 Maniola megala (Oberthür, 1909)

References

Satyrinae of the Western Palearctic

 
Satyrini
Butterfly genera
Taxa named by Franz von Paula Schrank